The 2018 Belarusian Super Cup was held on 10 March 2018 between the 2017 Belarusian Premier League champions BATE Borisov and the 2016–17 Belarusian Cup winners Dinamo Brest. Dinamo Brest won the match 2–1 and won the trophy for the first time.

Match details

See also
2017 Belarusian Premier League
2016–17 Belarusian Cup

References

Belarusian Super Cup
Super
Belarusian Super Cup
Sports competitions in Minsk
2010s in Minsk
Belarusian Super Cup 2018